Aleksejs Rumjancevs (born 13 February 1986) is a Latvian sprint canoer who has competed since the late 2000s. Together with Krists Straume he finished 11th place in the K-2 200 m event at the 2012 Summer Olympics. At the 2016 Olympics he placed fifth in the individual 200 m race. He was the flag bearer for Latvia during the closing ceremony.

Rumjancevs took up kayaking in 2004. He is married to Julia.

References

External links

LOV profile 

1986 births
Sportspeople from Riga
Latvian male canoeists
Living people
Canoeists at the 2012 Summer Olympics
Canoeists at the 2016 Summer Olympics
Olympic canoeists of Latvia
Canoeists at the 2015 European Games
ICF Canoe Sprint World Championships medalists in kayak
Canoeists at the 2019 European Games
European Games medalists in canoeing
European Games bronze medalists for Latvia